Neocollyris sawadai is a species of ground beetle in the genus Neocollyris in the subfamily Carabinae. It was described by Naviaux in 1991.

References

Sawadai, Neocollyris
Beetles described in 1991